Congleton railway station is a mainline station serving the Cheshire town of Congleton. It lies on the Stafford-Manchester branch of the West Coast Main Line in the United Kingdom.

History

Plans for a railway station in Congleton were first announced by the North Staffordshire Railway on 30 April 1845. Congleton Railway station was to be the terminus of a planned line from Congleton to Colwich via Burslem and Stoke-on-Trent, this planned line was to be called The Pottery Line.

The Stafford-Manchester line from Stoke-on-Trent to Congleton was opened on 9 October 1848 by the North Staffordshire Railway, with Congleton station opening on the same day.

Some North Staffordshire Railway through trains from Congleton railway station used the Potteries Loop Line.

The North Staffordshire Railway ran a limited number of passager trains Monday-Saturday from Congleton to Uttoxeter Railway Station and back calling at stations on the Potteries Loop line.

Congleton was the terminus for some London Midland and Scottish Railway passenger trains on the northern end of the Potteries Loop Line between Tunstall and Stoke on Trent.

Congleton railway station was the northern terminus for passenger trains on the Biddulph Valley Line.

Biddulph Valley Line passenger services were withdrawn on 11 July 1927. 

Despite the withdrawal of Biddulph Valley line passenger services, the London Midland and Scottish Railway ran special services on the Biddulph Valley line at the start of August each year.

In 1930 a third platform was added by the Nestle's Anglo Condensed Milk Company due to the importance of milk to economy of Congleton.

Congleton railway station was rebuilt in 1966. As part of the rebuild the station buildings were demolished and rebuilt, the level crossing was removed and the signal box was demolished.

With the closure of the goods yard Brunswick Wharf in Buglawton on 1 April 1968 sand was brought to Congleton via Congleton railway station.

Under British Railways Congleton was served by many special services from Stoke on Trent via the Potteries Loop line.

The station has, in the past, been subjected to vandalism.

In the past the station was served by trains to London, these services had stopped calling at Congleton by 1996.

In early privatisation, Virgin CrossCountry served the station Monday to Saturday.

In the past Congleton was one of the best-kept stations on the Stoke to Manchester via Macclesfield line, this was thanks to the staff who worked at the station.

In the past the station was maintained by Congleton In Bloom.

Accidents and incidents 
On 27 December 1864 there was a collision between a London and North Western Railway goods engine and van and a North Staffordshire Railway passenger train at Congleton junction where the Biddulph Valley line joined the Stafford-Manchester line.

On 17 February 1899 there was a collision at Congleton railway station.

On 19 January 2006 a Virgin CrossCountry Voyager train caught fire at Congleton railway station.

Facilities
The station has a staffed ticket office which is open during weekday and Saturday mornings with two self-service ticket machines available for ticket purchases at other times as well as modern help points on both platforms.

There is a waiting room on the southbound platform however this is boarded up and closed to the public.

The station has a chargeable car park and bicycle storage available. Step-free access is available to both the platforms at Congleton.

As part of the Congleton Transport Development Plan Cheshire East Council has proposed improving the quality of the station buildings and the cycling and parking facilities at Congleton railway station.

Services

Off-peak service in trains per hour is:
 1 tph to  via 
 1 tph to 

CrossCountry also operate a number of limited peak-hour services between Manchester Piccadilly, Birmingham New Street and Bournemouth although these services are currently suspended.

On Sundays, there is a reduced service of six trains in each direction throughout the day. This was increased from 5 each way in December 2018. The station was due to gain hourly Sunday services as part of the Northern franchise when operated by Arriva Rail North. These improvements were cancelled when Northern Trains took over the Northern franchise.

As part of the Congleton Transport Development Plan Cheshire East Council has proposed setting up a park and ride and improving rail services at Congleton railway station.

Best Kept Station
Below is a list of years in which Congleton railway station has won a best kept station award.
Best Kept station Stoke-on-Trent Division 1983
Best Kept station Stoke-on-Trent Division 1984

Notes

References

External links

  North Staffordshire Railway

Railway stations in Cheshire
Former North Staffordshire Railway stations
Railway stations in Great Britain opened in 1848
Northern franchise railway stations
Stations on the West Coast Main Line
DfT Category E stations
Congleton